Acanthosicyos horridus is an unusual melon that is endemic to the Namib desert.

Description
It is a dioecious, leafless, phreatophyte (meaning its roots penetrate deep down to water near the water table) that is found in sandy deserts but not stony plains, in areas with access to ground water such as ephemeral rivers and paleochannels, where sand accumulating in the shelter of its stems can form hummocks up to 1000–1500 m2 in area and 4 meters in height. Its stems may rise more than a meter above the hummocks, while its system of thick taproots can extend up to 50 m downward. The plant is leafless, so modified stems and spines 2–3 centimetres long serve as the photosynthetic "organs" of the plant. The plant can survive many years without water.

Ecology
Its sand-binding characteristics also help nara form microclimate within the desert dunes. These microclimates provide food and shelter for a variety of vertebrates. Presence of the nara plant is associated with significantly increased soil microdiversity likely due to the shade it provides and the attraction of foraging mammals which contribute to organic matter.

Acanthosicyos horridus typically occurs in the absence of other vegetation due to the harshness of the climate, though Eragrostis spinosa and Stipagrostis sabulicola grasses may grow between its hummocks. It is regarded as a keystone species because its melons, seeds, shoots, and flowers are food sources for beetles, gemsbok, and ostrich, while small rodents such as Rhabdomys pumilio, Desmodillus auricularis, and Thallomys nigricauda take shelter amid the spiny tangle of its stems. The katydid Acanthoproctus diadematus feeds on the plant, moving between different bushes at night.

Uses 

The melon fruits average 1 kg and are pale green and spiny. Within it has a sweet, aromatic, watery, yellow-orange pulp. The large edible seeds, white to cream in color, are known as butter-nuts or butterpips. These have been exported for use in baked goods.

The fruit serves as a food source for Nama people from February to April and August to September.

See also

 Nabkha
 Hummock

References

External links 
 PROTAbase on Acanthosicyos horridus
 

Cucurbitoideae
Endemic flora of Namibia
Desert fruits
Drought-tolerant plants
Taxa named by Joseph Dalton Hooker
Taxa named by George Bentham
Plants described in 1867